Michele Clapton is a British costume designer. She won at the BAFTA Awards for the four-part television series The Devil's Whore in the category of Best Costume Design.

She won an Emmy Award for the costumes in the hit HBO show Game of Thrones in 2012. She went on to win again in 2014 and 2016.

In 2016, starting with season 6 of HBO's epic fantasy series Game of Thrones, April Ferry took over Clapton's duties as the new costume designer for a majority of the sixth season. Clapton later returned to the show as costume designer for the seventh season.

Selected filmography

Film
The Secret Garden (2020)
Mamma Mia! Here We Go Again (2018)
Ali and Nino (2016)
Queen of the Desert (2015)
Before I Go to Sleep (2014)
Blood (2012)
Love and Other Disasters (2006)
My Family and Other Animals (2005)
Separate Lies (2005)
Chromophobia (2005)
Miranda (2002)
Chica de Río (2001)
The Nine Lives of Tomas Katz (2000)
Women Talking Dirty (1999)
Simon Magus (1999)
Dust Devil (1992)
Visions of Ecstasy (1989)

Television
Sense and Sensibility (2008)
The Crown (2016)
Game of Thrones (2011–2019)

References

External links

American costume designers
Living people
Primetime Emmy Award winners
Year of birth missing (living people)